The second inauguration of Ronald Reagan as president of the United States was held in a televised ceremony on January 20, 1985, at the  White House, and was repeated the following day, January 21, 1985, at the Capitol's rotunda. This was the 50th presidential inauguration and marked the commencement of the second and final four-year term of both Ronald Reagan as president and of George H. W. Bush as vice president. At 73 years, 349 days of age on Inauguration Day, Reagan was the oldest U.S. president to be inaugurated, until Joe Biden's inauguration as president on January 20, 2021, at the age of 78 years, 61 days.

Inauguration day
 
There, as they had the day before officially, Chief Justice Warren E. Burger administered the presidential oath of office to Reagan, and former Associate Justice Potter Stewart administered the vice-presidential oath to Bush. Jessye Norman sang Simple Gifts from Aaron Copland's Old American Songs at the ceremony.

Due to the inclement weather, the parade was canceled and a replacement event was put on in the Capital Centre; 96 people attended the first ceremony and thousands attended the second.

Inauguration committee
Former UPI correspondent John Chambers, son of Whittaker Chambers, served as executive director of the Joint Congressional Committee on the Presidential Inauguration, for Reagan's second inauguration and again in 1993 first inauguration of Bill Clinton.

Aftermath
On May 27, 1985 (Memorial Day), twenty of the more than fifty high school marching bands that had been scheduled to perform in the cancelled inaugural parade performed in the President's Inaugural Bands Parade held at Walt Disney World's EPCOT Center theme park. The performance was preceded by a speech delivered by President Reagan.

See also
Presidency of Ronald Reagan
First inauguration of Ronald Reagan
1984 United States presidential election
Ronald Reagan 1984 presidential campaign
1985 White House intrusion

References

External links

Text of Reagan's Second Inaugural Address
Audio of Reagan's Second Inaugural Address

1985 speeches
1985 in American politics
1985 in Washington, D.C.
Inaug 2
United States presidential inaugurations
Inauguration 1985
January 1985 events in the United States